Alexis Ruiz (born July 30, 1999) is an American archer competing in women's compound events. She won the silver medal in the women's team compound event at the 2019 World Archery Championships held in 's-Hertogenbosch, Netherlands.

In the 2019 Archery World Cup she won a medal in each of the four stages of the women's individual compound event. As a result, she climbed to the number one spot in the women's compound world rankings.

In 2020, she finished in 20th place in the women's compound event at The Vegas Shoot held in Las Vegas, United States.

References

External links 

 

Living people
1999 births
Place of birth missing (living people)
American female archers
World Archery Championships medalists
20th-century American women
21st-century American women